The 2008 Conference USA baseball tournament was the 2008 postseason college baseball championship of the NCAA Division I Conference USA, held at Turchin Stadium in New Orleans, Louisiana, from May 21–May 25, 2008.  Houston won their third C-USA tournament, and received Conference USA's automatic bid to the 2008 NCAA Division I baseball tournament.  The tournament consisted of eight teams, with two double-elimination brackets, and a single-game final.

Regular season results

SMU, Tulsa, and UTEP did not field baseball teams.  Memphis did not make the tournament.

Bracket

 Bold indicates the winner of the game.
 Italics indicate that the team was eliminated from the tournament.

Finish order

All-tournament team

References

External links
 2008 Entergy C-USA Baseball Championship

Tournament
Conference USA Baseball Tournament
Conference USA baseball tournament
Conference USA baseball tournament
2000s in New Orleans
Baseball competitions in New Orleans
College baseball tournaments in Louisiana